Albert Askharovich Doguzov (born 12 March 1968) is a Russian professional football coach and a former player.

Club career
He made his professional debut in the Umaglesi Liga in 1990 for FC Liakhvi Tskhinvali.

References

1968 births
People from Tskhinvali
Living people
Russian footballers
Association football midfielders
FC Spartaki Tskhinvali players
FC Spartak Vladikavkaz players
FC Spartak-UGP Anapa players
FC Chernomorets Novorossiysk players
FC Fakel Voronezh players
Erovnuli Liga players
Russian Premier League players
Russian football managers